Colobothea bisignata is a species of beetle in the family Cerambycidae. It was described by Bates in 1865. It is known from Suriname, French Guiana, Guyana, Peru, Brazil, Ecuador.

References

bisignata
Beetles described in 1865